HMAS Dechaineux (SSG 76) is the fourth of six Collins class submarines operated by the Royal Australian Navy (RAN).

Named for Captain Emile Dechaineux, the boat was laid down in 1993 and launched in 1998. Dechaineux and sister boat Sheean were modified during construction as part of the "fast track" program—an attempt to fix the problems affecting the Collins class, and put at least two fully operational submarines in service before the last Oberon-class submarine was decommissioned.

In 2003, a seawater pipe burst while Dechaineux was submerged deep, nearly resulting in the loss of the submarine.

Design and construction

The Collins class is an enlarged version of the Västergötland-class submarine designed by Kockums. The hull is constructed from high-tensile micro-alloy steel, and are covered in a skin of anechoic tiles to minimise detection by sonar.

The submarine is armed with six  torpedo tubes, and carry a standard payload of 22 torpedoes: originally a mix of Gould Mark 48 Mod 4 torpedoes and UGM-84C Sub-Harpoon, with the Mark 48s later upgraded to the Mod 7 Common Broadband Advanced Sonar System (CBASS) version.

Each submarine is equipped with three Garden Island-Hedemora HV V18b/15Ub (VB210) 18-cylinder diesel engines, which are each connected to a 1,400 kW, 440-volt DC Jeumont-Schneider generator. The electricity generated is stored in batteries, then supplied to a single Jeumont-Schneider DC motor, which provides  to a single, seven-bladed,  diameter skewback propeller. The Collins class has a speed of  when surfaced or at snorkel depth, and can reach  underwater. Each boat has an endurance of 70 days.

The fast track program required the installation of reliable diesel engines, fixing hydrodynamic noise issues by modifying the hull design and propeller, and providing a functional combat system. The original Rockwell International-designed combat system had been cancelled, but because there wasn't enough time to evaluate the replacement system to include it in the "fast track" program, the two submarines were fitted with components from the old Rockwell system, which were augmented by commercial off-the-shelf hardware and software. Even with the enhanced Rockwell system, it was believed that the capabilities of the fast track Collins boats was only equivalent to the Oberons.

Dechaineux was laid down by the Australian Submarine Corporation on 4 March 1993, launched on 12 March 1998, and commissioned into the RAN on 23 February 2001. Dechaineux was named for Captain Emile Dechaineux, who was killed by a kamikaze attack on 21 October 1944 while commanding .

Operational history
On 14 December 2000, Dechaineux and Sheean arrived at HMAS Stirling, following the completion of sea trials.

On 12 February 2003, Dechaineux was operating near her maximum safe diving depth off the coast of Western Australia when a seawater hose burst. The high-pressure seawater flooded the lower engine room before the hose was sealed off: it was estimated that if the inflow had continued for another twenty seconds, the weight of the water would have prevented Dechaineux from returning to the surface. The RAN recalled the Collins-class submarines to base after the incident, and after engineers were unable to determine the flaw in the pipes that caused the incident, instructed that the maximum safe depth of the class be reduced.

Dechaineux underwent a maintenance period during 2009 and early 2010; the submarine was returned to service in late May 2010.

On 9 November 2010, Dechaineux was damaged after a tugboat helping the submarine to manoeuvre from her berth at HMAS Stirling crossed over the submarine's stern. The submarine was sent to the Australian Marine Complex at Henderson, Western Australia for repairs: these were completed within a week, and Dechaineux was operational by late November.

During 2012, Dechaineux underwent an intermediate maintenance docking, assisted  during trials of the MU90 Impact torpedo, and participated in several training exercises.

See also
 Major submarine incidents since 2000

Citations

References
Books
 
 
 

Journal and news articles
 
 
 
 

 

Other media

External links
Royal Australian Navy webpage for HMAS Dechaineux
Australian War Memorial Captain Emile Dechaineux site

Collins-class submarines
Ships built in South Australia
1998 ships
Submarines of Australia
Military Units in Western Australia